Alejandro Ortiz may refer to:

 Alejandro Ortiz (basketball) (born 1952), Cuban basketball player
 Alejandro Ortíz (footballer) (born 1958), Guatemalan football midfielder
 Álex Ortiz (born 1985), Spanish football centre-back